Lewis and Clark State Park is a state park in the US state of Iowa consisting of  located in Monona County. The park features camping, picnicking, boating, swimming, and fishing on  Blue Lake.  It has 95 electric camp sites and has a full size replica of a keelboat of the type used by the Lewis and Clark Expedition when they stopped in this area in 1804 on their way up the Missouri River.

References

External links
Iowa Dept. of Natural Resources webpage on the park

State parks of Iowa